Abraham Charité (25 August 1917 – 26 February 1991) was a Dutch weightlifter. He was born and died in The Hague. He won a bronze medal in the heavyweight class at the 1948 Summer Olympics in London, breaking national records in all three moves. As of 2014 this remains the last Olympic medal in weightlifting for the Netherlands. The 1948 Olympics also counted as European Championships, and thus Charité became a 1948 European champion as the gold and silver medals were won by Americans.

Charité also competed at the 1952 Olympics, but withdrew due to back pains.

References

1917 births
1991 deaths
Sportspeople from The Hague
Dutch male weightlifters
Weightlifters at the 1948 Summer Olympics
Weightlifters at the 1952 Summer Olympics
Olympic weightlifters of the Netherlands
Olympic bronze medalists for the Netherlands
Olympic medalists in weightlifting
Medalists at the 1948 Summer Olympics
20th-century Dutch people